Collective Eye Films is a non-profit documentary production and distribution organization based in Portland, OR. The organization was first established in 2004 in San Francisco, CA as a documentary production and distribution collective. Collective Eye Film fulfills its mission of "unearthing stories to make a difference", through continued production and the distribution of over 120 feature documentaries. Since 1984 Collective Eye Films has created documentary films that explore various social, political, environmental, and spiritual issues and causes.

Executive Producer
The Co- Founder and President of Collective Eye is Taggart Siegel. Taggart Siegel is also an Emmy-nominated and award-winning American Filmmaker

Collective Eye Produced Films
 Between Two Worlds
 Bitter Harvest
 Blue Collar & Buddha
 Body Memories
 The Disenchanted Forest
 The Heart Broken in Half
 Purdah (film)
 The Real Dirt on Farmer John 
 The Split Horn: Life of a Hmong Shaman In America]
 Seed: The Untold Story 
 Queen of The Sun

Films Distributed by Collective Eye Films
 Arresting Power: Resisting Police Violence in Portland, Oregon

References

External links
 http://sourceoregon.com/collective_eye_films
 https://www.imdb.com/company/co0201404/
 http://www.angelicorganics.com/ao/index.php?option=com_content&task=view&id=148&Itemid=182

Documentary film production companies
Film production companies of the United States
Companies based in Portland, Oregon
Entertainment companies established in 1984
1984 establishments in California